Elvira Amanda Orphée (29 May 1922 in San Miguel de Tucumán – 26 April 2018) was an Argentine writer.

Biography
Elvira Orphée was born in San Miguel de Tucumán. Her father was a chemist of Greek origin, and her mother was a teacher. Often ill as a child, she learned to write early. After attending a convent school, she left aged sixteen for Buenos Aires after her mother died. She studied literature at the University of Buenos Aires and at the Sorbonne in Paris. Orphée has lived in France, Italy, Spain and Venezuela. She married artist Miguel Ocampo, the nephew of Victoria Ocampo, in Paris but divorced him after she returned to Argentina. She published her first novel Dos veranos (Two summers) in 1956.

Orphée has published short stories and articles in various publications such as El Tiempo, Revista de Occidente, Asomante, Cuadernos, Razon and Zona Franca e Imagen.

She was awarded a Guggenheim Fellowship in Creative Arts in 1988.

Selected works
 Uno, novel (1961), Honourable mention in the Fahril Editorial Literary Contest
 Aire tan dulce (Air so sweet), novel (1966), second prize in the Municipality of Buenos Aires
 En el fondo, novel (1969), first prize in the Municipality of Buenos Aires
 La última conquista de El Ángel (El Angel's last conquest) (1984)
 La muerte y los desencuentros (Death and missteps), novel (1990), received the Regional Prize
 Ciego del cielo (Heavenly blind), stories (1991)

References

1922 births
2018 deaths
Argentine women novelists
Argentine women short story writers
University of Buenos Aires alumni
University of Paris alumni
People from San Miguel de Tucumán
Argentine expatriates in France
Argentine people of Greek descent